The Naismith Cup was an annual pre-season National Basketball Association (NBA) exhibition game. From the 1995 season through 2000, it was played between the two Canadian NBA rivals, the Toronto Raptors and the Vancouver Grizzlies, at neutral venues across Canada. The cup was named after James Naismith, the Canadian inventor of basketball, and was originally created to raise money for Canada Basketball, similar to the Pearson Cup competition between  Canada's Major League Baseball teams the Toronto Blue Jays and Montreal Expos (which have since relocated to Washington).  Following the Grizzlies relocation to Memphis the cup was laid dead, though the Raptors continued the tradition of hosting neutral site pre-season games in Canadian cities under the NBA Canada Series name.  The Raptors won the series against Vancouver 4–1.

Prior to the 2003 season, the cup was revived as an international match between the Raptors and a European team, played at the Air Canada Centre in Toronto. In 2003 the opponent was the Panathinaikos A.O. of Athens, Greece, while in 2004 the Benetton Treviso of Treviso, Italy visited Toronto. The final competition in 2005 saw the Raptors' only international loss, against Maccabi Tel Aviv of Tel Aviv, Israel. The current whereabouts of the Naismith Cup are unknown.

Results

Other neutral site Raptors games and international opponents
In addition to the Naismith Cup games, the Raptors have played several other neutral site preseason games in Canadian cities.  During their first two seasons of play (1995–1997), prior to the completion of construction on their new home the Air Canada Centre, the Raptors played three regular season games at Copps Coliseum in Hamilton, Ontario.  The team also lost a preseason game to the Miami Heat 119–89 at Marine Midland Arena in nearby Buffalo, New York before 12,748 fans on 18 October 1996.  A second game, against the New York Knicks, was scheduled for 15 October 1998 at the arena, but was cancelled due to the 1998–99 NBA lockout.  The team has subsequently discussed the possibility of playing additional preseason and regular season games in Buffalo.  The Buffalo Braves played a total of 16 regular season games at Maple Leaf Gardens in Toronto from 1971 to 1975.  Blue Cross Arena in Rochester, New York hosted a Raptors pre-season 103-81 victory over the Cleveland Cavaliers in 2006 before 9,429 fans.  More recently, the team has participated in a number of games as part of the NBA Canada Series.

Since the end of the Naismith Cup, the Raptors have continued to play international opponents.  They hosted Maccabi Tel Aviv of Israel again in 2006, Žalgiris Kaunas of Lithuania in 2007, CSKA Moscow of Russia in 2008, Real Madrid of Spain in 2012, and Maccabi Haifa of Israel in 2014, and have played away games against Lottomatica Roma of Italy and Real Madrid of Spain in 2007.  They hosted San Lorenzo de Almagro of Argentina during the 2016 preseason, and Melbourne United of Australia in 2018.

Toronto has also participated in NBA Global Games, playing a preseason game against the Boston Celtics in Rome, Italy in 2007, two regular season games against the New Jersey Nets in London, England in 2011, a regular season game in London against the Orlando Magic in 2016, and a preseason games against the Houston Rockets in Saitama, Japan in 2019.

See also
 NBA Global Games
 NBA Canada Series
 List of games played between NBA and international teams
 NBA versus EuroLeague games
 McDonald's Championship
 EuroLeague American Tour

References

Toronto Raptors
Vancouver Grizzlies
Panathinaikos B.C.
Basketball competitions in Canada
NBA vs FIBA